Grigoris Arnaoutoglou (born December 17, 1973) is a well-known Greek television host. He is known for hosting morning daily entertaining show, Omorfos Kosmos To Proi as well as Sunday show Pio Poli Tin Kiriaki on Mega Channel. Today he is hosting The 2night Show, a talk show Ekatomyriouhos, on ANT1 .

Career
Arnaoutoglou started his television career in Thessaloniki, where he was for almost a decade the basic host in many local television projects and shows. He became famous through his weekly television programme in Mega Channel, in the end of the 1990s. Its name was Omorfos Kosmos. On this show, Arnaoutoglou was filming his travelling in the Greek mainland and islands and talking to people on the street.

Filmography

Television

Books 
 Makigiarismenoi Fovoi,  January 2012,

References 

Greek television presenters
1973 births
Living people
People from Munich